T. V. Ramesh (born 1 October 1983), professionally credited as Ramesh Pisharody, is an Indian stand-up comedian, impressionist, television presenter, actor and film director. He works in Malayalam television shows, stage, and cinema.

Early life
Pisharody was born as the youngest son in the family and has four siblings. He studied his first and second grades at Kendriya Vidyalaya in Velloor. It was an English-medium school, where he made his mimicry debut by imitating a dog's barking for a musical drama. After putting pressure on his family he was moved to a Malayalam-medium school from his third grade onward so that he can enjoy holidays on Saturdays and there was no school uniform. Since then he has been participating in mimicry competitions.

After winning second prize at a youth festival at Mahatma Gandhi University, Kerala, he started getting stage programmes. In 2000, he joined Cochin Stallions, the mimicry troupe formed by actor Salim Kumar, where he worked for four years. Meanwhile, he completed graduation in politics from Dewaswom Board College, Thalayolaparambu. After which, he teamed up with mimicry artist Sajan Palluruthi and together they did several programmes.

Career
He joined Salim Kumar's mimicry troupe Cochin Stallions when it was formed in 2000 and worked for four years. He also made his television debut in 2000 in an Onam-special program with Salim Kumar on Asianet. Three years later, he began working with comedians Sajan Palluruthy and Kalabhavan Prajod in the comedy program Comedy Show on Asianet. Later, he went on to work in more comedy programs in Asianet, such as Cinemala, Five Star Thattukada, and Comedy Cousins. It was while working in Cinemala he first met Dharmajan Bolgatty, both of them would later team up to form a comedy duo. When Asianet Plus was launched in 2005, Pisharody and Dharmajan co-hosted the comedy show Bluffmasters. The show was a breakthrough in their career and it ran for more than 450 episodes. Besides, he also frequently performs on stage as a stand-up comedian.

He debuted as a film actor through Positive (2008) in a prominent supporting role. Although his first release was Nasrani (2007) in which he played a minor role. He then went on to act in several Malayalam films, mostly in supporting roles. In the 2014 film To Noora with Love, he acted in a negative role. His first leading role was in the comedy film Kappal Muthalaali (2009). His other notable films include Celluloid (2013), Left Right Left (2013),  Immanuel and Amar Akbar Anthony. In 2013, Dharmajan and Pisharody teamed again for the comedy series Badai Bungalow on Asianet with Pisharody as co-host (with Mukesh) and Dharmajan as actor. It aired for five years.

Pisharody made his directional debut in 2018 through the comedy-drama Panchavarnathatha starring Jayaram and Kunchacko Boban, which received favourable reviews and successful run at the box office. His second directional venture was Ganagandharvan'' with Mammootty.

Personal life
Ramesh is married to Soumya and the couple have three children.

Filmography

Films
As actor

As director

Dubbing Artist

Television

Awards
2015: Asianet Comedy Awards – Best Anchor
2016: Asianet Television Awards – Entertainer of the Year 
Kerala Sangeetha Nataka Akademi – Yuva Prathibha Puraskaram (mimicry)
Asiavision Film Awards – Promising Director in Family Entertainment
2018:Flowers TV awards -Best Anchor
2019: Mazhavil Entertainment Awards – All-rounder

References

External links 
 

Living people
Male actors from Palakkad
Male actors in Malayalam cinema
Indian male film actors
Kendriya Vidyalaya alumni
Malayalam comedians
Male actors from Kottayam
Indian male comedians
21st-century Indian male actors
Indian male television actors
Male actors in Malayalam television
20th-century Indian male actors
1983 births